Majagua Municipal Museum is a museum located in Majagua, Cuba. It was established on 5 January 1982.

The museum holds collections on history, weapons, decorative arts and ethnography.

See also 
 List of museums in Cuba

References 

Museums in Cuba
Buildings and structures in Ciego de Ávila Province
Museums established in 1982
1982 establishments in Cuba
20th-century architecture in Cuba